John-David Mercer Schofield (October 6, 1938 – October 29, 2013) was a bishop-in-residence in the Anglican Church in North America (ACNA).

Schofield was the rector of St. Columba's Inverness in the Episcopal Diocese of California. He served as the fourth bishop of the Episcopal Diocese of San Joaquin, from October 9, 1988, to October 22, 2011, when the diocese was part of the Episcopal Church. In 2007, due to theological disagreements, Schofield led the majority of the diocese to join the Anglican Church of the Southern Cone and become the Anglican Diocese of San Joaquin. The diocese was a founding member of the Anglican Church in North America in June 2009. He served as the first bishop of the Anglican Diocese of San Joaquin until his retirement in 2011, remaining as bishop-in-residence until his death.

Schofield died in Fresno on October 29, 2013, aged 75 years old.

Notes

External links
Diocese of San Joaquin official website

1938 births
2013 deaths
Bishops of the Anglican Church in North America
20th-century Anglican bishops in the United States
21st-century Anglican bishops in the United States
People from Inverness, California
People from Fresno, California
Episcopal bishops of San Joaquin
Anglican realignment people